Astrogirl may refer to:

AstroGirl, an American teenage magazine
"Astrogirl", a song by S.P.O.C.K
"Astrogirl", a song by Suede on their 2002 album A New Morning
Astro Girl, a character in the manga series Astro Boy